Cornelius Lacy Golightly (May 23, 1917- March 20, 1976)  was the first black president of the Detroit Board of Education. He was a teacher, civil rights activist, public intellectual, and educational administrator.

Early life 
Cornelius L. Golightly was born on March 23, 1917 in Waterford, Mississippi. His father, Reverend Richmond Mack Golightly, was from Livingston, Alabama. His mother, Margaret Fullilove was from Honey Island, Mississippi. Golightly was one of ten children.

Education 
In 1934, when Golightly was 17 years-old, he enrolled at Talladega College in Alabama. He did well academically as well as in athletics. In 1938 he participated in the "Intellectual Olympics," a competition held in New York City by the New History Society. He was one of only five black students from across the US to earn honors in the competition. After graduating from Talladega in 1938 Golightly went to the University of Michigan to study philosophy. He earned a Master's degree in 1939 and a PhD in 1941.

Career 
Golightly became an instructor of philosophy and social science at Howard University for the academic year 1942-1943. He was also the president of the Barnett Aden Gallery in Washington, DC during the same time. In 1943 he became a Compliance Analyst with the Fair Employment Practices Committee (FEPC). In 1945 he went back to academics, taking a post as an academic philosopher at Olivet College. This appointment, as a professor of philosophy and psychology, marks a turning point in history, as Golightly became the first black philosopher permanently hired to teach at a white institution during the 20th century. In 1949 he left Olivet in protest over restrictions placed on academic freedoms based on the perceived threats during the Cold War. He was hired to join the Philosophy department of the University of Wisconsin at Madison, where he continued to teach until 1955. At that time he moved to the University of Wisconsin in Milwaukee, where he stayed until 1969. At that time Golightly accepted an appointment as Associate Dean and Professor of Philosophy at Wayne State University in Detroit. This appointment made him the first African American to teach in the philosophy department of Wayne State.

References 

1917 births
1976 deaths
20th-century American philosophers
African-American philosophers
University of Michigan alumni
Howard University faculty
Olivet College faculty
University of Wisconsin–Madison faculty
University of Wisconsin–Milwaukee faculty
Wayne State University faculty
Members of the Detroit Board of Education
20th-century African-American people